Leslie William Benjamin Blizzard (13 March 1923 – December 1996) was an English footballer with Queens Park Rangers, Bournemouth & Boscombe Athletic, Yeovil Town and Leyton Orient.

Career
He signed for Queens Park Rangers in 1944 and played war time football alongside Alec Stock. He made his league debut in the 1–0 win against Norwich City in March 1947. He played right half and went on to play only four league games for Rangers before transferring to Bournemouth & Boscombe Athletic in 1947. He broke his leg on debut, and joined Yeovil Town in May 1948. He featured in Yeovil's 1948–49 FA Cup run, including the 2–1 defeat of First Division side Sunderland. He later signed for Leyton Orient where he played over 220 games.

After leaving Orient, he played non-league football for Headington United, Canterbury City and Whitstable Town.

References
General
 Kaufman, Neilson. Leyton Orient: The Complete Record. Breedon Books

Specific

1923 births
1996 deaths
Footballers from Acton, London
English footballers
Association football wing halves
Queens Park Rangers F.C. players
AFC Bournemouth players
Yeovil Town F.C. players
Leyton Orient F.C. players
Oxford United F.C. players
Canterbury City F.C. players
Whitstable Town F.C. players
English Football League players